Plainview is a neighborhood in the city of Jeffersontown, Kentucky and is located on the former site of the Plainview Dairy Farm. It is a Planned Unit Development which includes housing, workplaces, and shopping within a single development.

Plainview is located between I-64 and Shelbyville Road east of Hurstbourne Parkway.

The Plainview community has many amenities; such as the Swim & Tennis Center, where there is a swim team, with competitions throughout the year. There is also a yearly yard sale.

See also
 R. C. Tway, owner of farmland that evolved into this neighborhood

References

Neighborhoods in Louisville, Kentucky